William Charles "Bucky" Scribner (July 11, 1960 – September 16, 2017) was a professional American football punter in the  National Football League. He played college football for the Kansas Jayhawks and was selected as the first-team punter on the 1980 All-Big Eight Conference football team. A left-footed punter, he played five seasons for the Green Bay Packers (1983–1984) and the Minnesota Vikings (1987–1989).

He died from brain cancer on September 16, 2017.

References

1960 births
2017 deaths
Sportspeople from Lawrence, Kansas
Players of American football from Kansas
American football punters
Kansas Jayhawks football players
Green Bay Packers players
Minnesota Vikings players
Deaths from brain cancer in the United States
National Football League replacement players